The Bomen railway station is a heritage-listed closed railway station located on the Main South line in Bomen in the City of Wagga Wagga local government area of New South Wales, Australia. The property was added to the New South Wales State Heritage Register on 2 April 1999. Passenger trains no longer stop at the station.

Description 

The complex comprises a type 2 brick station building that was completed in 1877. The building was restored in the early 2000s. A signal box was completed in 1878; and a separate signal box constructed , timber with skillion roof, removed . The type 3 brick station master's residence was completed in 1877 and was sold in November 1994 and is now privately owned. A brick toilet block and lamp room was completed in 1877. Other structures include a brick platform face that was completed in 1877; and a well, with decorative iron vents.

Heritage listing 
As at 24 November 2000, Bomen station group and residence was a rare one-off design station from the boom period of railway construction. Of particular importance is the continuous pitched roof extending over the platform and the recessed verandah on the street side. The verandah column details are also unusual. The intactness of the buildings is also of significance. The inclusion of the well is an unusual element in a station group. This station was the terminus of the southern line from September 1878 to September 1879 while the rail bridge over the Murrumbidgee River and flood plain was finished. They are focal buildings in the small township of Bomen and indicate the former significance of the site in the development of the railway system throughout the state.

The Bomen railway station was listed on the New South Wales State Heritage Register on 2 April 1999 having satisfied the following criteria.

The place possesses uncommon, rare or endangered aspects of the cultural or natural history of New South Wales.

This item is assessed as historically rare. This item is assessed as scientifically rare. This item is assessed as arch. rare. This item is assessed as socially rare.

See also 

List of railway stations in New South Wales

References

Attribution

External links

Disused regional railway stations in New South Wales
Railway stations in Australia opened in 1878
New South Wales State Heritage Register
Bomen, New South Wales
Articles incorporating text from the New South Wales State Heritage Register
Main Southern railway line, New South Wales